Nuno Assis Lopes de Almeida (born 25 November 1977) is a Portuguese former professional footballer who played as an attacking midfielder.

He amassed Primeira Liga totals of 282 matches and 33 goals over 12 seasons, representing in the competition Alverca, Gil Vicente, Vitória de Guimarães (three spells) and Benfica. He also spent four years in the Cypriot First Division, with Omonia.

Club career
Born in Lousã, Coimbra District, Assis started playing football in his hometown, before being spotted by Sporting CP. He then moved to the Lisbon club's youth system, and later was loaned to its farm team Sporting Clube Lourinhanense. He made his debut in the Primeira Liga in 1999–2000, playing 19 matches for F.C. Alverca while still on loan from Sporting, and was subsequently loaned a final time the following season to Gil Vicente FC, for whom he scored his first-ever top flight goals.

In summer 2001, Assis was released by the Lions, signing with Vitória de Guimarães. In his second year he scored three goals in 33 matches, netting four in 31 in the following campaign. He started off 2004–05 with the Minho side, but moved to S.L. Benfica in the following winter transfer window to replace fading Zlatko Zahovič; he scored on his debut, in a 2–1 away success against Moreirense FC.

Prior to 2008–09 kick-off, after being used relatively in three and a half seasons, Assis was released by Benfica alongside Luís Filipe, re-joining Vitória Guimarães. On 30 January 2009 he netted his first career hat-trick, in a 4–2 win at Vitória de Setúbal.

In the 2009–10 season Assis continued to feature prominently for Vitória, scoring five goals in 26 matches as the team finished sixth. In mid-June 2010, the 32-year-old signed with Saudi Arabian team Ittihad FC, for his first abroad experience; in his first match, on 14 August, he helped to a 2–1 win against Al-Ettifaq.

In late August 2011, Assis re-joined Vitória Guimarães. In the following summer he moved clubs and countries again, after agreeing to a deal with Omonia Nicosia. He netted twice from 28 Cypriot First Division appearances in his debut campaign, but had the intention to leave after his contract expired due to financial differences, eventually changing his mind and also becoming captain.

Doping case
After a domestic league match between Benfica and C.S. Marítimo on 3 December 2005, Assis allegedly tested positive for a banned substance. In February of the following year, UEFA's Control and Disciplinary Body suspended the player from all official UEFA matches, after the test results were declared – Benfica won 1–0 and the result was not contested. On 7 May Benfica's president, Luís Filipe Vieira, came out contesting the alleged positive result, as proper procedure was not followed for the tests (the 72-hour delay between collection of the sample and the test for anomalous quantities of different substances might have led to sample degradation and false positives).

On 14 July 2006, the Justice Council of the Portuguese Football Federation threw out the sentence on technicalities, specifically the disregard for the defence of Assis, and removed the six-month suspension to the player after he was initially suspended for five months. Benfica threatened to press charges to try and identify who was responsible for the false charges and for the whole procedure, and asked for the destitution of the laboratory director and the technicians involved in this case; on the 19th, Portuguese sports newspapers O Jogo and A Bola quoted the president of the laboratory that handled the sample and made the analysis (LAD, Anti-Doping Lab) claiming that the player had been tested positive for 19-norandrosterona, a steroid – according to the president statement, sample A contained 4.5 nanograms per milliliter (ng/ml) and the counter-sample 4.0 ng/ml. The legal limit for such substance is 2.0 ng/ml and a normal person usually has between 0.1 and 0.2 with a maximum of 0.6 ng/ml.

The following day Vieira replied, accusing Luís Horta (president of LAD) and Luís Sardinha (president of the National Anti-Doping Council, CNAD) of fabricating data and lying to protect themselves – he brought to light that the meeting of CNAD that decided to prosecute the athlete did so disregarding the technical analysis that proposed that charges should be dropped, according to the meeting's agenda. One of his charges stated that CNAD punished the athlete knowing he was innocent only to hide the mess made by LAD collecting and analysing the sample. The original Justice Council of the Portuguese Football Federation sentencing included an indication that, in order to claim doping, it had to be proved that an athlete had the illegal substance in his body and that he had intentionally done it; at this point the World Anti-doping agency stepped in because the burden of proof of consumption intent in doping cases would undermine any doping situation. This appeal to the Court of Arbitration for Sport  agreed with the agency and found that foul-play was with the player and the original six-month sentence was increased to one year. At no point during the appeal were the LAD or CNAD procedures contested.

International career
Assis' first full cap for Portugal was won under coach Agostinho Oliveira in November 2002, in a friendly match. He came in as a substitute in the 2–0 victory over Scotland.

Assis returned to the national team after more than six years of absence, taking the pitch during the second half of the decisive 2010 FIFA World Cup qualifier against Malta (4–0, in Guimarães). He was not picked, however, for the final stages in South Africa.

Career statistics

Honours
Benfica
Primeira Liga: 2004–05
Supertaça Cândido de Oliveira: 2005
Taça de Portugal runner-up: 2004–05

Omonia
Cypriot Super Cup: 2012
Cypriot Cup runner-up: 2015–16

Individual
Cypriot First Division Team of the Season: 2015–16

See also
List of doping cases in sport

References

External links

1977 births
Living people
People from Lousã
Portuguese footballers
Association football midfielders
Primeira Liga players
Segunda Divisão players
Sporting CP footballers
F.C. Alverca players
Gil Vicente F.C. players
Vitória S.C. players
S.L. Benfica footballers
Saudi Professional League players
Ittihad FC players
Cypriot First Division players
AC Omonia players
Portugal under-21 international footballers
Portugal B international footballers
Portugal international footballers
Portuguese expatriate footballers
Expatriate footballers in Saudi Arabia
Expatriate footballers in Cyprus
Portuguese expatriate sportspeople in Saudi Arabia
Portuguese expatriate sportspeople in Cyprus
Doping cases in association football
Portuguese sportspeople in doping cases
Sportspeople from Coimbra District